is a Japanese anime director from Chiba, Japan.

Anime directed
Gakuen Utopia Manabi Straight!
Galaxy Angel A
Galaxy Angel Z
Panyo Panyo Di Gi Charat
Tristia of the Deep Blue Sea

External links

1976 births
Japanese animators
Anime directors
Japanese animated film directors
Living people
People from Chiba Prefecture
21st-century Japanese people